''not to be confused with the Northeastern Correctional Center in Massachusetts

Northeast Correctional Center is a Missouri Department of Corrections state prison for men located in Bowling Green, Pike County, Missouri.  The facility opened in 1998 and has a working capacity of 2,098.

Incidents
A prisoner was found dead on the baseball field within the facility in 2005.

Correctional Officer Maggie Long was stabbed several times on July 26, 2017.

References

Prisons in Missouri
Buildings and structures in Pike County, Missouri
1998 establishments in Missouri